École supérieure d'agricultures d'Angers (ESA Angers) a French engineering College created in 1898.

The school trains engineers in agronomy and agriculture.

Located in Angers, the ESA Angers is a private higher education institution of general interest recognised by the State. The school is a member of the Conférence des Grandes écoles.

Notable alumni 
 François-Henri de Virieu, a French journalist and television presenter

References

External links
 ESA Angers

Engineering universities and colleges in France
ESA
Angers
Educational institutions established in 1898
1898 establishments in France